Drummoyne ferry wharf (also known as Wolseley Street ferry wharf) is located on the southern side of the Parramatta River serving the Sydney suburb of Drummoyne. It served by Sydney Ferries Parramatta River services operating between Circular Quay and Parramatta. The single wharf is served by RiverCat class ferries.

Upgrades
On 30 April 2014, the wharf closed for a five-month rebuild. The existing wharf was demolished, with a new one being built comprising a steel floating pontoon, a small concrete fixed entry platform and an aluminium gangway connecting the entry platform to the pontoon. It reopened on 17 September 2014.

Wharves & services

References

External links

 Drummoyne Wharf  at Transport for New South Wales (Archived 12 June 2019)
Drummoyne Wharf Local Area Map Transport for NSW

Ferry wharves in Sydney